K-Love Classics was a Christian classic hits radio network owned by Educational Media Foundation (EMF) and was carried over FM stations, translators, and HD subchannels in the United States. Such stations include WAIW 88.1 in Wheaton, Illinois. The network was one of the formats produced by EMF. Airing Christian music from the 1980s, 1990s, and early in the decade of the 2000s, the K-Love Classics format debuted in June 2018 as an internet-only station but quickly moved to terrestrial radio on FM and HD Radio subchannels after a large response to the new format.

On November 2, 2020, K-Love Classics was discontinued, and was subsequently replaced by new decade-specific networks devoted to the 1990s and 2000s.

History
K-Love Classics was launched in June 2018 as an internet radio station featuring classic Contemporary Christian music (CCM) from the 1980s, 1990s, and the early part of the decade of the 2000s, akin to the secular classic hits format. In response to popular demand, Educational Media Foundation (EMF) began airing the format over its nationwide network of full-power FM stations, low-power translators, and HD Radio subchannels. In August 2018, WAIW in Wheaton, Illinois (a suburb of Chicago) became the first terrestrial radio station to broadcast K-Love Classics.

More stations were added over the next several weeks, including in Palm Springs, California as well as subchannels of WLVU in Nashville and KLVB in Sacramento. For a brief period starting in August 2018, K-Love Classics was available in Los Angeles on KKLQ-HD3, but the following month it was replaced with Radio Nueva Vida programming. However, in August 2020, K-Love Classics came back to the Los Angeles airwaves on KYLA-HD3 and KYRA-HD3.

On November 2, 2020, K-Love Classics was discontinued; the network began carrying "K-Love Christmas" as a temporary format, with the EMF stating plans for new programming to premiere in 2021.  

On January 1, 2021, the K-Love Classics network was divided into two new networks—"K-Love 90's" and "K-Love 2000's"—devoted to CCM from the 1990s and 2000s respectively. In September 2022, as part of the 40th anniversary of K-Love's launch, the EMF added additional internet radio stations devoted to CCM from the 1970s, 1980s, and 2010s, as well as the "K-Love Birthday Blend", which carries CCM spanning the network's 40-year history.

List of stations
In addition to the online stream, K-Love Classics was relayed by numerous terrestrial radio stations throughout the United States. The following list of stations is the extent of the network as of its total shutdown in early November 2020. Unless otherwise indicated, all stations are on the FM band.

Former Stations Prior to November 2020 Network Closure

References

External links

Contemporary Christian radio stations in the United States
Radio stations established in 2018
2018 establishments in California
Radio stations disestablished in 2020
2020 disestablishments in California
Defunct radio networks in the United States